Muradbəyli or Muradbeyli or Muradbegly may refer to:
Muradbeyli, Agdam, Azerbaijan
Muradbəyli, Sabirabad, Azerbaijan